Stade Africain de Menzel Bourguiba, often referred to as SAMB is a football club from Menzel Bourguiba in Tunisia. Founded in 1938, the team plays in green and white colors. Their ground is the Stade Azaiez Jaballah, which has a capacity of 6,500.

The team used to be called Union Sportive Ferryville (USF) as the city of Menzel Bourguiba used to be Ferryville.

Honours
Tunisian League 2 : 2
1973-74, 1976–77
Tunisian Cup : 1
1941-42 (as US Ferryville)

Football clubs in Tunisia
Association football clubs established in 1946
Sports clubs in Tunisia